The 1998 Skate Canada International was the second event of six in the 1998–99 ISU Grand Prix of Figure Skating, a senior-level international invitational competition series. It was held in Kamloops, British Columbia on November 5–8. Medals were awarded in the disciplines of men's singles, ladies' singles, pair skating, and ice dancing. Skaters earned points toward qualifying for the 1998–99 Grand Prix Final.

Results

Men

Ladies

Pairs

Ice dancing

References

Skate Canada International, 1998
Skate Canada International
1998 in Canadian sports 
1998 in British Columbia